A One Day International (ODI) is a form of limited overs cricket, played between two teams that have international status, as determined by the International Cricket Council (ICC). The first ODI match was played between Australia and England in 1971 at the Melbourne Cricket Ground, as a 40-over match. An ODI can have four possible results—it can be won by either of the two teams, it could be tied, or it could be declared to have "no result". In cricket, a match is said to be tied if it ends with both teams scoring exactly the same number of runs and with the side batting second having completed its innings with all 10 batsmen being out or the predetermined number of overs having been completed. In case of rain-affected matches, the match is tied if the Duckworth–Lewis–Stern method indicates that the second team exactly meets but does not exceed the par score. There have been two occasions where a match has been tied, but the team which had lost fewer wickets was declared the winner. Pakistan was involved in both matches, losing one against India and winning the other against Australia.

The first tie in ODIs occurred in 1984 when Australia played West Indies in the second final of the Benson and Hedges World Series Cup; the Wisden Cricketers' Almanack noted "[the match] led to more dissension than delight." The second tie, also involving Australia, occurred in 1989 during the second match of the Texaco Trophy in England. Between 1991 and 1997, at least one ODI was tied every year. Starting from 1999, a further 19 ties have occurred until 2014, more frequently than ever before. The first World Cup match involving a tie was the second semi-final of the 1999 tournament when Australia played South Africa. Since then, at least one match was tied in the subsequent tournaments, with the exception of the 2015 edition, until the 2019 World Cup.

 there have been a total of forty-two ties in ODIs, including two which have been decided by a Super Over. Two other matches finished with the scores level but one side was declared to have won by virtue of losing fewer wickets; these are not recorded as tied matches. Every Test-playing nation has been involved in a tied match except Bangladesh; West Indies have been involved in the most (ten). Five ties have occurred each in Australia, England and the West Indies. Three ties have occurred at Queens Sports Club, Bulawayo, Zimbabwe.

Tied ODIs

Tiebreakers
Until recently, tied One Day Internationals generally have not proceeded to a tiebreaker, unless they are knockout matches in tournaments. As such the use of any tiebreaker is rare. 

The 2019 Cricket World Cup Final was the first One Day International to go to a Super Over. The Super Over was also tied, so the match was determined by boundary countback. Because England had scored more boundaries in both the main game and the Super Over, they were declared winners of the match, and therefore the World Cup.

The second ODI to be determined with a Super Over was played between Zimbabwe and Pakistan on 2 November 2020. Pakistan could only score 3 runs, which Zimbabwe reached with 3 balls remaining.

Wicket count
There have been two instances where the team which lost fewer wickets was declared the winner.

By teams

See also
List of tied first-class cricket matches
Tied Test
List of tied Twenty20 Internationals

Notes

References

One Day International cricket
Lists of cricket matches
One Day Internationals,Tied